Dibble Peak is a peak  southwest of Post Office Hill in the Kyle Hills of Ross Island. At the suggestion of P.R. Kyle, it was named by the Advisory Committee on Antarctic Names (2000) after Raymond R. Dibble, a geophysicist at the Victoria University of Wellington, New Zealand, who visited Cape Crozier in the 1962–63 season; made seismic and volcanic observations of Mount Erebus during the 1970s, also 1980–86 as a founding member of the International Mount Erebus Seismic Study; after retirement from Victoria University and involvement with the New Zealand Antarctic Programme, Dibble joined the United States Antarctic Program (USAP) and the NMIMT team (Kyle) in the maintenance and upgrading of the seismic stations run by the Mount Erebus Volcano Observatory, 1993–94, 1994–95, 1995–96, and 1997–98.

References 

Mountains of Ross Island